Forcoli is a village in Tuscany, central Italy, administratively a frazione of the comune of Palaia, province of Pisa. At the time of the 2001 census its population was 1,701.

Forcoli is about 40 km from Pisa and 7 km from Palaia.

References 

Frazioni of the Province of Pisa